Habronattus ustulatus is a species of spider in the family Salticidae. It is found in the USA and Mexico.

References

 Bradley, Richard A. (2012). Common Spiders of North America. University of California Press.
 Ubick, Darrell (2005). Spiders of North America: An Identification Manual. American Arachnological Society.

Salticidae
Spiders described in 1979